The Kitzbüheler Horn Transmitter is a  transmission tower made of reinforced concrete on the summit of the Kitzbüheler Horn near Kitzbühel in Austria. The Kitzbühler Horn Transmitter does not have a cylindrical shaft. It broadcasts TV and VHF radio programmes.
The tower was taken into service on 12 December 1969 as a combined radio and television transmission facility for the ORF after a difficult two-year-long construction period, preceded by lengthy and intensive negotiations with local authorities and land owners.

To facilitate the switchover to DVB-T, the analogue channels ORF 1 (Channel 5, 3 kW) and ORF 2 - Tirol (Channel 24, 30 kW) were switched off on 22 October 2007.

Frequencies and programmes

Analogue radio (VHF)

Digital television (DVB-T)

External links 
 

Buildings and structures in Tyrol (state)
Radio technology
Kitzbühel